Power Without Glory: Racing the Big-Twin Cooper is a new history of early Cooper racing cars.

Power Without Glory: Racing the Big-Twin Cooper, was, like the novel, written by an Australian, Terry Wright, and was published in 2015 . The title alludes to the 1948 and onwards Cooper twin's enormous power-to weight ratio, with which the little car was expected to challenge the then dominant front-engined racing cars of France and Italy.

References 

2015 non-fiction books
Australian non-fiction books